"Dumb Enough" is a song by Australian hip hop group Hilltop Hoods. The song was released as the second single from their 2003 album, The Calling. "Dumb Enough" reached #44 on the Triple J Hottest 100, 2003. The hook contains a vocal sample of KRS-One's "Build Ya Skillz".

Media
MP3 recording of the song on Obese Records' website: .

References

2003 songs
Hilltop Hoods songs
Songs written by Bill Withers
Obese Records singles